Pavati is a boat manufacturer headquartered in White City, Oregon. They specialize in building all aluminum drift boats, power boats, jetboats, and as of 2013, Pavati wake boats. The company was founded in 2003 and created fishing boats designed for salmon.

Pavati Wake Boats
In 2013 Paviti introduced their first wakeboard boat. This boat was the first of its kind to be made with 100% aluminum, as opposed to traditional fiberglass. Pavati boats are some of the most expensive on the wake boat marketplace, with pricing well above $300,000.

Models

Drift Boats

Models

References

American boat builders
Companies based in Jackson County, Oregon
American companies established in 2003